Tetanops integer is a species of ulidiid or picture-winged fly in the genus Tetanops of the family Tephritidae.

References

integer